Watta satta or shighar, is an exchange marriage common in Pakistan and Afghanistan.

The custom involves the simultaneous marriage of a brother-sister pair from two households. In some cases, it involves uncle-niece pairs, or cousin pairs. Watta satta is more than just an exchange of women from two families or clans; it establishes the shadow of mutual threat across the marriages. A husband who abuses his wife in this arrangement can expect his brother-in-law to retaliate in kind against his sister. Watta satta is cited as a cause of both low domestic violence in some families, and conversely for extreme levels of reciprocal domestic violence in others. 

In Pakistan it is typically endogamous, with over 75% marriages involving blood relatives, and 90% of these marriages occurring within the same village, tribe or clan (zaat, biraderi). In rural parts of Pakistan, watta satta accounts for over 30% of all marriages.

Rationale

The rationale for watta satta custom has been theorized as an environment with generally low and uncertain incomes, weak or uncertain legal institutions of the state, watta satta may be the most effective means available to the poor to prevent marital discord, divorces and domestic abuse. It enables a form of social pressure and reciprocity, wherein a man who abuses his wife is expected to be deterred by the possibility that his own sister will suffer from similar or more severe retaliation by the brother of his wife. In practice, watta satta may either promote peace in the two families, or (as has also been observed) produce escalating, retaliatory episodes of domestic violence.

Bride exchange between two families is also seen as an informal way to limit demands and consequences of dower (brideprice) and dowry disputes.

Prevalence
In rural parts of northwest and west Pakistan, and its tribal regions, watta satta accounts for over 30% of all marriages.

Watta satta is implicitly an endogamous form of marriage. In practice, Over 50% of watta satta marriages are within the same village; on a geographical level, over 80% of women either live in the same village of their birth or report being able to visit it and return home in the same day. Over three out of four women in watta satta marriage are married to a blood relative, mostly first-cousins with a preference for the paternal side; of the rest, majority are married to someone unrelated by blood but within the same zaat and biradari (a form of clan in Muslim communities of Pakistan) or clan.

The custom of bartering brides is also observed in Muslim agrarian societies of Afghanistan.

In Islamic communities of Mali, bride exchange between two families has also been observed. It is locally called falen-ni-falen. The practice is prevalent in rural parts of Yemen as well.

In Islam
Shighar is the practice of exchanging brides between two  families, where the girl and dowry of one family is exchanged for a girl and dowry from another family. This is prevalent in Saudi Arabia and neighboring countries. This practice is often a means to reduce or evade dowry, and as such is prohibited in Islam, although it is prevalent in Saudi Arabia. Muhammad is reported in Sahih Bukhari and Sahih Muslim to have said "There is no Shighar in Islam."

See also
 Baad
 Consanguinity
 Double cousin
 Honour killing in Pakistan
 Inbreeding
 Incest
 Vani (custom)

References

 Zaman, Muhammad (2011) Exchange Marriages in South Punjab, Pakistan: A Sociological Analysis of Kinship Structure, Agency, and Symbolic Culture. Frankfurt (M)/ Berlin: Peter Lang Publisher

External links
 Watta Satta: Exchange Marriage and Women’s Welfare in Rural Pakistan
 
 [Zaman, Muhammad. 2011. Exchange Marriages in South Punjab, Pakistan: A Sociological Analysis of Kinship Structure, Agency, and Symbolic Culture. Frankfurt (M)/ Berlin: Peter Lang Publisher]

Marriage, unions and partnerships in Pakistan
Marriage, unions and partnerships in Afghanistan
Types of marriage